The Peoples Improv Theater (PIT), also known as the PIT, is a comedy theater and training center in New York City, founded by comedian Ali Farahnakian in 2002. Shows combine improvisational comedy, sketch comedy, stand-up, theater, and variety. Each show is hosted by a combination of "house teams" of comedians hired by PIT and by outside comedians.

After closing several of their theaters due to the COVID-19 pandemic, The PIT now only resides in its PIT Loft location in the Chelsea neighborhood of Manhattan.

Notable alumni of the PIT include The Office actress Ellie Kemper, comedian and voice actress Kristen Schaal, and comedian and actor Hannibal Buress.

History
The Peoples Improv Theater's Loft location was founded by Ali Farahnakian and Armando Diaz in 2002. The PIT moved its headquarters to 123 East 24th Street, New York on December 31, 2010. From September 1, 2015, the original location of the PIT became known as The Pit Loft and officially became the third venue of the PIT.

Wednesdays were designated as "Super Free Wednesday" in the Striker location, with free shows offered to the public. Musical improv troupe Vern performed weekly since 2014.

In 2018, Farahnakian opened The PIT Chapel Hill, also known as The PITCH, in his home state, at 462 West Franklin Street, Chapel Hill, North Carolina.

In February 2021, the PIT announced the closure of its Flatiron location, leaving only the Loft open in Manhattan. In June 2021, the PIT Loft reopened, hosting classes, jams, and open mics.

The PIT also published comedy sketches to a collective YouTube channel named PITtv.

See also
 Magnet Theater
 Upright Citizens Brigade Theater
 Improvisational theatre
 List of improvisational theatre companies
 Impact of the COVID-19 pandemic on the performing arts

Notes

References

External links 
Video interview with Ali (Reza) Farahnakian

Performance art in New York City
Former theatres in Manhattan
Kips Bay, Manhattan
Chelsea, Manhattan
2002 establishments in New York City
Arts organizations established in 2002
Improv Theatre companies in New York City